Roy James "Philip" Locke (29 March 192819 April 2004) was an English actor who had roles in film and television. He is perhaps best known for his part in the James Bond film Thunderball as Largo's personal assistant and chief henchman, Vargas.

Biography

Early career 
Locke trained at RADA, and from the late 1950s was part of the ensemble at the Royal Court Theatre, where John Osborne described him as "special and reliable".

Television 
On television, Locke is remembered by fans of the science fiction series Doctor Who for his appearance in the 1982 serial Four to Doomsday as Bigon. Other TV credits include: The Baron, The Avengers episodes 'The Frighteners' (1961), 'Mandrake' (1964), and 'From Venus With Love' (1967), The Saint, The Champions, Department S, Z-Cars, Pennies from Heaven, The Omega Factor, Codename Icarus, The Box of Delights, Bergerac, Inspector Morse, Jeeves and Wooster, Minder, Antony and Cleopatra, She Fell Among Thieves (BBC), Oliver Twist, Ivanhoe and Jekyll & Hyde.

Stage 
A member of the Royal Shakespeare Company, Locke also played Professor Moriarty on Broadway in Sherlock Holmes in 1974–76 and appeared in Amadeus at the National Theatre.

Personal life 
Locke was survived by his companion, Michael Ivan.

Filmography

 Cloak Without Dagger (1956) - 1st Soldier
 Heart of a Child (1958) - 1st Soldier
 The Bulldog Breed (1960) - Teddy Boy in Cinema Fight (uncredited)
 The Girl on the Boat (1961) - Bream Mortimer
 Seven Keys (1961) - Norman's Thug (uncredited)
 Follow That Man (1961) - Vicar
 On the Run (1963) - David Hughes
 Edgar Wallace Mysteries, (Incident at Midnight episode) (1963) - Foster
 Edgar Wallace Mysteries, "Face of a Stranger" episode (1964) - John Bell
 Father Came Too! (1964) - Stan
 Thunderball (1965) - Vargas
 The Fiction Makers (1968) - Frug
 Hitler: The Last Ten Days (1973) - Hanske
 Escape to Athena (1979) - Colonel Vogel
 Porridge (1979) - Banyard
 Oliver Twist (1982, TV Movie) - Mr. Sowerberry
 Ivanhoe (1982) - Grand Master
 The Plague Dogs (1982) - Civil Servant #1 (voice)
 Ascendancy (1983) - Dr. Strickland
 And the Ship Sails On (1983) - Prime Minister
 The Inquiry (1986)
 Stealing Heaven (1988) - Poussin
 Jekyll & Hyde (1990) - Editor
 Turbulence (1991) - Vic
 Jacob (1994) - Diviner
 Tom & Viv (1994) - Charles Haigh-Wood
 Othello (1995) - 1st Senator
 Wilde'' (1997) - Judge

References

External links
 
 Obituary in The Scotsman

1928 births
2004 deaths
Alumni of RADA
English male film actors
English male stage actors
English male television actors
Male actors from London
People from Marylebone
Royal Shakespeare Company members